Conner House is a historic house located in Manassas Park, Virginia. The main section was built about 1810, with a later wing added in 1855. It is a two-story, gable-roof, stone residence. The Conner House served from July to November 1861 as the headquarters of General Joseph E. Johnston, commander of the Confederate Army during the first several months of its existence. In 1973 the Town (now City) of Manassas Park purchased the house and yard.

It was added to the National Register of Historic Places in 1981.

References

Houses on the National Register of Historic Places in Virginia
Houses completed in 1855
National Register of Historic Places in Manassas Park, Virginia